This is a list of star systems within 25–30 light-years of Earth.

See also
 List of nearest stars and brown dwarfs
 List of star systems within 20–25 light-years
 List of star systems within 30-35 light-years
 Lists of stars
 List of nearest bright stars
 Spherical shell

References

star systems within 25-30 light-years
Star systems
star systems within 25-30 light-years